David John Ashford  is an independent politician in the Isle of Man. He was born in 1977 in Douglas. He has served as a Member of the House of Keys (MHK) for the Douglas North constituency since 2016.

Political career 
Previously he had been a Borough Councillor for Douglas. In January 2018 he was appointed as Minister for Health and Social Care succeeding Kate Beecroft. This position was widely described as a "poisoned chalice" due to the department's financial problems.

In February 2020 he was briefly appointed as interim Minister for Home Affairs after the death of Bill Malarkey.

Ashford was appointed Member of the Order of the British Empire (MBE) in the 2020 Birthday Honours for services to the Isle of Man during the COVID-19 pandemic.

On 20 May 2022, he resigned from his role as Minister for the Treasury after an employment tribunal ruled that the Isle of Man's medical director, Dr Rosalind Ranson, had been unfairly sacked for being a whistleblower.

Election results

2015

2016

References

Members of the House of Keys 2016–2021
1977 births
Living people
Members of the Order of the British Empire